Krzysztof Beck (12 April 1930 – 3 July 1996) was a Polish weightlifter. He competed at the 1956 Summer Olympics and the 1960 Summer Olympics.

References

1930 births
1996 deaths
Polish male weightlifters
Olympic weightlifters of Poland
Weightlifters at the 1956 Summer Olympics
Weightlifters at the 1960 Summer Olympics
People from Kolomyia
People from Stanisławów Voivodeship
20th-century Polish people